Thyla may refer to

Thyla (fiction), a 2011 fiction book by Kate Gordon
Thyla (portmanteau), a portmanteau for some opossum genera
Thyla (thylacine), shortening for thylacine